Torre Bermeja may refer to:

Torre Bermeja (tower), a tower on the Playa de la Barrosa in the Province of Cadiz
Torre Bermeja (Albéniz), a composition by Isaac Albéniz